Ringling Brothers Parade Film is a 1902 short subject film produced by William Nicholas Selig. The three-minute film captures a Ringling Brothers Circus parade featuring elephants, camels, and caged lions in downtown Indianapolis, Indiana. Onlookers are visible along the route as the parade moved south on Capitol Avenue, past the Indiana Statehouse, then east on Washington Street.

The film was thought lost until 2011 when an Oakland, California, couple donated an unmarked canister containing the film to the Niles Essanay Silent Film Museum. After the film was researched, identified, and restored, it was uploaded to YouTube in October 2020. In 2021, the film was deemed "culturally, historically, or aesthetically significant" and was inducted into the National Film Registry by the Library of Congress. It was chosen because it depicted a rare glimpse of a northern Black community in the early 20th century.

As of December 2021, it is the eleventh oldest film in the registry.

References

External links

1902 short films
African-American history of Indianapolis
United States National Film Registry films
Rediscovered American films
1900s rediscovered films
1902 in Indiana
Films shot in Indiana
Films shot in Indianapolis
Films set in Indianapolis